Kaisar Nurmaganbetov (born August 5, 1977 in Zhezqazghan) is a Kazakhstani sprint canoer who has competed since 1995. At the 1996 Summer Olympics, he was eliminated in the semifinals of both the C-2 500 m and the C-2 1000 m events. Four years later, Nurmaganbetov was eliminated in the semifinals of both the C-1 500 m and the C-1 1000 m. He was eliminated in the semifinals of those same events at the 2004 Summer Olympics in Athens. For his most recent Summer Olympics in Beijing, Nurmaganbetov was eliminated in the semifinals of the C-2 500 m event.

References

1977 births
Canoeists at the 1996 Summer Olympics
Canoeists at the 2000 Summer Olympics
Canoeists at the 2004 Summer Olympics
Canoeists at the 2008 Summer Olympics
Kazakhstani male canoeists
Living people
People from Karaganda Region
Olympic canoeists of Kazakhstan
Asian Games medalists in canoeing
Canoeists at the 1998 Asian Games
Canoeists at the 2002 Asian Games
Canoeists at the 2006 Asian Games
Medalists at the 1998 Asian Games
Medalists at the 2002 Asian Games
Medalists at the 2006 Asian Games
Asian Games gold medalists for Kazakhstan
Asian Games silver medalists for Kazakhstan
Asian Games bronze medalists for Kazakhstan